The Tatra Mountains, Tatras, or Tatra  (Tatry either in Slovak or in Polish - plurale tantum), are a series of mountains within the Western Carpathians that form a natural border between Slovakia and Poland. They are the highest mountains in the Carpathians. The Tatras are distinct from the Low Tatras, a separate Slovak mountain range further south.

The highest peak, called Gerlachovský štít, at 2,655 m (8710 ft), is located north of Poprad, entirely in Slovakia. The highest point in Poland, Rysy, at 2,499 m (8200 ft), is located south of Zakopane, on the border with Slovakia.

The main ridge of the Tatras runs from the village of Huty at the western end to the village of Ždiar at the eastern end.

The Tatras are now protected by law by the establishment of the Tatra National Park, Slovakia and the Tatra National Park, Poland, which are jointly entered in UNESCO's World Network of Biosphere Reserves.
In 1992, UNESCO jointly designated the Polish and Slovak parks a transboundary biosphere reserve in the World Network of Biosphere Reserves, under its Man and the Biosphere Programme.

Etymology 
The first written record of the name is from 999, when the Bohemian Duke Boleslaus II, on his deathbed, recalled when the Duchy of Bohemia extended to the Tritri montes. Another mention is in the 1086 document from Henry IV, wherein he referred to the Diocese of Prague with Tritri mountains. Still another is in 1125, where the Kosmas chronicles (Chronica Boemorum) mention the name Tatri.

Machek in 1931 favored the theory of the Polish linguist Rozwadowski with a syllabic r like in the words chrt (Czech hound), smrt (Czech death). In Czech this syllabic is sometimes with vowels i, e or u for example črný – černý, so the Czech reconstruction from Tritri/Tritry would be Trtry. In Polish, the term Tatry is firstly mentioned in 1255. Syllabic r often has vowels on both sides in Polish, so in case of Tarty we can reconstruct the name to Tartry, where the vowel a originated before the syllabic r which dissimilated. This theory is supported by Hungarian forms of term Turtur, Turtul, Tortol from 12th to 14th centuries. It is unknown how the Slovak term looked like until the 17th century when the form Tatry is firstly mentioned and was probably taken from Polish and later found its way into Czech and Hungarian. The term Tatra also appears as a general term in Slovak for barren or stony land, and also in Little Russia for rocks and little stones in a river. Machek stresses that the name has no Slavic origin and mentions Rozwadowski's theory of an Illyrian origin because of a connection with a Herzegovian highland called Tatra, thus taken from local inhabitants. The name is also close to the Ukrainian word for gravel, toltry.

Overview

The Tatras are a mountain range of a corrugated nature, originating from the Alpine orogeny, and therefore characterized by a relatively young-looking lie of the land, quite similar to the landscape of the Alps, although significantly smaller. It is the highest mountain range within the Carpathians.

It consists of the internal mountain chains of:
 Eastern Tatras (Východné Tatry, Tatry Wschodnie), which in turn consist of: 
 the Belianske Tatras (Belianske Tatry, Tatry Bielskie)
 and the High Tatras (Vysoké Tatry, Tatry Wysokie) 
 Western Tatras

The overall nature of the Tatras, together with their easy accessibility, makes them a favorite with tourists and researchers. Therefore, these mountains are a popular winter sports area, with resorts such as Poprad and the town Vysoké Tatry (The Town of High Tatras) in Slovakia created in 1999, including former separate resorts: Štrbské Pleso, Starý Smokovec, and Tatranská Lomnica or Zakopane, called also "winter capital of Poland". The High Tatras, with their 24 (or 25) peaks exceeding 2,500 m above sea level, together with the Southern Carpathians, represent the only form of alpine landscape in the entire  length of arc of the Carpathians.

Ownership and border disputes
By the end of the First Polish Republic, the border with the Kingdom of Hungary in the Tatras was not exactly defined. The Tatras became an unoccupied borderland. On 20 November 1770, under the guise of protection against the epidemic of plague in the Podolia, an Austrian army entered into Polish land and formed a cordon sanitaire, seizing Sądecczyzna, Spiš and Podhale. Two years later, the First Partition of Poland allocated the lands to Austria. In 1824, Zakopane region and area around Morskie Oko were purchased from the authorities of the Austrian Empire by a Hungarian Emanuel Homolacs. When Austria-Hungary was formed in 1867, the Tatra Mountains have become a natural border between the two states of the dual monarchy, but the border itself still has not been exactly determined. In 1889, a Polish Count Władysław Zamoyski purchased at auction the Zakopane region along with the area around Morskie Oko. Due to numerous disputes over land ownership in the late 19th century, attempts were made at the delimitation of the border. They were fruitless until 1897, and the case went to an international court which determined on 13 September 1902 the exact course of the Austro-Hungarian border in the disputed area.

A new round of border disputes between Poland and Czechoslovakia started immediately after the end of the First World War, when these two countries were established. Among other claims, Poland claimed ownership of a large part of the Spiš region. This claim also included additional parts of the Tatra Mountains. After several years of border conflicts, the first treaty (facilitated by the League of Nations) was signed in 1925, with Poland receiving a small northernmost part of the Spiš region, immediately outside (to the north-east of) the Tatra Mountains, thus not changing the border in the mountains themselves. During the Second World War there were multiple attempts by both sides of the conflict to occupy more land, but the final treaty signed in 1958 (valid until present day) preserved the border line agreed in 1925.

Borders and hiking 

With the collapse of the Austrian Empire in 1918 and the creation of Poland and Czechoslovakia, the Tatra Mountains started to be divided by international border. This brought considerable difficulties to hikers, as it was illegal to cross the border without passing through an official border checkpoint, and for many decades there were no checkpoints for hikers anywhere on the border ridge. The nearest road border crossings were Tatranská Javorina - Łysa Polana and Podspády - Jurgów in the east, and Suchá Hora - Chocholów in the west. Indeed, those who did cross elsewhere were frequently fined or even detained by border police of both countries. On the other hand, the permeable border in the Tatra Mountains was also heavily used for cross-border smuggling of goods such as alcohol, tobacco, coffee, etc. between Poland and Czechoslovakia. Only in 1999, more than 80 years after the dissolution of the Austrian Empire, the governments of Poland and Slovakia signed an agreement designating several unstaffed border crossings (with only irregular spot checks by border police) for hikers and cyclists on the 444 km-long Slovak-Polish border. One of these border crossings was created in the Tatra Mountains themselves, on the summit of the Rysy peak. However, there were still many other peaks and passes where hiking trails ran across the border, but where crossing remained illegal. This situation finally improved in 2007, with both countries accessing the Schengen Area. Since then, it is legal to cross the border at any point (i.e. no further official checkpoints were designated). Rules of the national parks on both sides of the border still apply and they restrict movement to official hiking trails and (especially on the Slovak side) mandate extensive seasonal closures in order to protect wildlife.

Climate

The Tatras lie in the temperate zone of Central Europe. They are an important barrier to the movements of air masses. Their mountainous topography causes one of the most diverse climates in that region.

Precipitation
The highest precipitation figures are recorded on the northern slopes. Precipitation occurs from 215 to 228 days a year. Thunderstorms occur 36 days a year on average.

Snow cover
Maximum thickness on the summit amounts to:
 in Poland - Kasprowy Wierch: 
 in Slovakia - Lomnický Štít: 
Peaks are sometimes covered with snow or ice throughout the year. Avalanches are frequent.

Temperature
Temperatures also vary depending on the altitude and sun exposure of a given slope. Temperatures below  last for 192 days on the summits.

Winds

The average wind speed on the summits is 6 m/s.
southerly winds on the northern side
westerly winds at the base of Tatra (Orava-Nowy Targ Basin)
foehn winds (Polish: halny) most often occur between October and May. They are warm and dry and can cause extensive damage.
Maximum wind speed  (6 May 1968).

On 19 November 2004, large parts of the forests in the southern Slovak part of the High Tatras were damaged by a strong wind storm. Three million cubic metres of trees were uprooted, two people died, and several villages were totally cut off. Further damage was done by a subsequent forest fire, and it will take many years until the local ecology is fully recovered.

Flora

The Tatra Mountains have a diverse variety of plant life. They are home to more than 1,000 species of vascular plants, about 450 mosses, 200 liverworts, 700 lichens, 900 fungi, and 70 slime moulds. There are five climatic-vegetation belts in the Tatras.

The distribution of plants depends on altitude:
up to 1,300 m: Carpathian beech forest; almost no shrub layer, herbaceous layer occupies most of the forest floor
to 1,550 m: Spruce forest; shrub layer poorly developed, mosses are a major component
to 1,800 m: Mountain Pine, numerous herbs
to 2,300 m: high altitude grasslands
from 2,300 m up: Subnivean - bare rock and almost no vegetation (mostly lichens)

Fauna

The Tatra Mountains are home to many species of animals: 54 tardigrades, 22 turbellarians, 100 rotifers, 22 copepods, 162 spiders, 81 molluscs, 43 mammals, 200 birds, 7 amphibians and 2 reptiles.

The most notable mammals are the Tatra chamois, marmot, snow vole, brown bear, wolf, Eurasian lynx, red deer, roe deer, and wild boar. Notable fish include the brown trout and alpine bullhead.

The endemic arthropod species include a caddis fly, the spider Xysticus alpicola and a springtail.

Summits

Eastern Tatras

Gerlachovský štít - 2655 m (Slovakia)
Lomnický štít - 2634 m (Slovakia)
Ľadový štít - 2627 m (Slovakia)
Pyšný štít - 2621 m (Slovakia)
Zadný Gerlach - 2616 m (Slovakia)
Lavínový štít - 2606 m (Slovakia)
Ľadová kopa - 2602 m (Slovakia)
Kotlový štít - 2601 m (Slovakia)
Malý Pyšný štít - 2592 m (Slovakia)
Kežmarský štít - 2558 m (Slovakia)
Vysoká  - 2547 m (Slovakia)
Končistá - 2538 m (Slovakia)
Baranie rohy - 2526 m (Slovakia)
Dračí štít - 2523 m (Slovakia)
Ťažký štít - 2520 m (Slovakia)
Malý Kežmarský štít - 2513 m (Slovakia)
Rysy - 2503 m, 2499 m (Slovakia/Poland)
Kriváň - 2495 m (Slovakia)
Slavkovský štít - 2452 m (Slovakia)
Batizovský štít - 2448 m (Slovakia)
Veľký Mengusovský štít (Slovak); Mięguszowiecki Szczyt Wielki (Polish) - 2438 m (Slovakia/Poland)
Malé Rysy (Slovak); Niżnie Rysy (Polish) - 2430 m (Slovakia/Poland)
Východna Vysoka - 2429 m (Slovakia)
Východný Mengusovský štít (Slovak); Mięguszowiecki Szczyt Czarny (Polish) - 2410 m (Slovakia/Poland)
Prostredný Mengusovský štít (Slovak); Mięguszowiecki Szczyt Pośredni (Polish) - 2393 m (Slovakia/Poland)
Čubrina (Slovak); Cubryna (Polish) - 2376 m (Slovakia/Poland)
Svinica (Slovak); Świnica (Polish) - 2301 m (Slovakia/Poland)
Kozi Wierch - 2291 m (Poland)
Jahňaci štít - 2230 m (Slovakia)
Zamarła Turnia - 2179 m (Poland)
Kościelec - 2155 m (Poland)
Mnich - 2068 m (Poland)

Western Tatras

Bystrá - 2248 m (Slovakia)
Jakubina - 2194 m (Slovakia)
Baranec - 2184 m (Slovakia)
Baníkov - 2178 m (Slovakia)
Klin (Slovak); Starorobociański Wierch (Polish) - 2176 m (Slovakia/Poland)
Pachoľa - 2167 m (Slovakia)
Hrubá kopa - 2166 m (Slovakia)
Nižná Bystrá - 2163 m (Slovakia)
Štrbavy - 2149 m (Slovakia)
Jalovecký príslop - 2142 m (Slovakia)
Hrubý vrch (Slovak); Jarząbczy Wierch (Polish) - 2137 m (Slovakia/Poland)
Tri kopy - 2136 m (Slovakia)
Veľká Kamenistá (Slovak); Kamienista (Polish) - 2126 m (Slovakia/Poland)
Krzesanica - 2122 m (Slovakia/Poland) - summit of Czerwone Wierchy / Red Mountains
Volovec (Slovak); Wołowiec (Polish) - 2064 m (Slovakia/Poland)
Kasprov vrch (Slovak); Kasprowy Wierch (Polish) - 1987 m (Slovakia/Poland)
Giewont - 1894 m (Poland)
Sivý vrch - 1809 m (Slovakia)

Tourism

In 1683, an anonymous author published a book of adventures and excursions in the Tatras. It became very popular in Europe and contributed to the growth of tourism in the Tatras. As it later turned out, its author was Daniel Speer, born in Wrocław, who for a time lived in the sub-Tatra region.

A popular tourist destination in Poland is Zakopane but the developed tourist base also includes Kościelisko, Poronin, Biały Dunajec, Bukowina Tatrzańska, Białka Tatrzańska, Murzasichle, Małe Ciche, Ząb, Jurgów, Brzegi.

In Slovakia, the most important tourist base is the city Vysoké Tatry, consisting of three parts: Štrbské Pleso, Starý Smokovec and Tatranská Lomnica.

The Polish "national mountain" (featured prominently in myths and folklore) is Giewont, while the Slovak one is Kriváň.

Trails

Orla Perć is considered the most difficult and dangerous mountain trail in the Tatras, a suitable destination only for experienced tourists and climbers. It lies exclusively within the Polish part of the Tatras, was conceived in 1901 by Franciszek Nowicki, a Polish poet and mountain guide, and was built between 1903-1906. Over 100 individuals have lost their lives on the route since it was established. The path is marked with red signs. The death of Polish philosopher Bronisław Bandrowski is often used by guides as a cautionary tale for tourists. He committed suicide after he was trapped for days on a rocky ledge in one of the trails near Zakopane.

The highest point in the Tatra Mountains that can be freely accessed by a labeled trail is Rysy.

Most of the peaks in the Western Tatras (on both sides of the border), including the main ridge are freely accessible by hiking trails. In the Slovak part of the Eastern Tatras, only seven peaks (out of 48 with prominence of at least 100 m) are accessible by hiking trails (Rysy, Svinica/Świnica, Slavkovský štít, Kriváň, Kôprovský štít, Východná Vysoká, and Jahňací štít). Two of these (Rysy and Svinica/Świnica) are located on the border with Poland and accessible from the Polish side. The rest of the peaks on the Slovak side (including the highest one, Gerlachovský štít) can only be accessed when accompanied by a certified mountain guide. UIAA members can climb them without a certified guide, but not using the normal (easiest) routes (from the III degree of difficulty).

In the Slovak part most of the hiking trails in the Tatras are closed from 1 November to 15 June. Only trails from settlements up to the mountain huts are open. In Poland, the trails are open year-round.

Human engagement
In the 18th and 19th centuries, the mountains were used for sheep grazing and mining. Many trees were cut down to make way for humans. Although these activities were stopped, the impact is still visible. Moreover, pollution from the industrialized regions of Kraków in Poland or Ostrava in Czech Republic, as well as casual tourism, cause substantial damage. Volunteers however initiate litter removal events frequently, on both sides of the border.

The Slovak Tatra National Park (Tatranský národný park; TANAP) was founded in 1949, and the contiguous Polish Tatra National Park (Tatrzański Park Narodowy) in 1954. The two parks were added jointly to the UNESCO Biosphere Reserve list in 1993.

In 2013, the International Union for Conservation of Nature threatened to cancel the Slovak TANAP's status of a national park because of the large investments (mainly in skiing infrastructure) in the park, which seriously interfere with the landscape and nature.

In popular culture
 The theme of the song "Nad Tatrou sa blýska" is that there is a storm in the Tatras. The song was the second part of the dual national anthem of Czechoslovakia from 1918 to its dissolution in 1993, and since became the national anthem of Slovakia.
 Czech composer Vítězslav Novák's 1902 symphonic poem V Tatrách ('In the Tatras', Op.26) was directly inspired by the mountains.

The 1999 film Ravenous was filmed in the Tatra Mountains.
In 2006, the Bollywood film Fanaa, portraying places in Kashmir, was filmed at Zakopane, mainly because of the risks associated with insurgency in Kashmir, as well due to some similarities in a mountain landscape.
 Leo Frankowski mentions the Tatras several times in his science fiction novels in the Conrad Stargard series.

Notable people
(Alphabetical by surname)
 Adam Asnyk, poet and dramatist, one of the first members of the Tatra Society
 Klemens Bachleda (1851-1910), Polish mountain guide and mountain rescuer
 Oswald Balzer
 Tytus Chałubiński, founder of the Polish Tatra Society
 Jan Długosz (mountaineer)
 Walery Eljasz-Radzikowski
 Julian Fałat
 Jan Nepomucen Głowacki, considered the father of Polish school of landscape painting, was the first to devote an entire series of works to Tatra Mountains
 Seweryn Goszczyński, Polish Romantic poet who escaped there from the Austrian invader
 Ludwig Greiner, identified Gerlachovský Peak as the summit of the Tatras and Carpathians
 Ruth Hale (alpinist)
 Władysław Hasior
 William Horwood (novelist), whose novel Wolves of Time largely takes place in the Tatra mountains
 Mieczysław Karłowicz
 Jan Kasprowicz
 Kornel Makuszyński
 Franciszek Nowicki
 Władysław Orkan
 Kazimierz Przerwa-Tetmajer
 Daniel Speer, Baroque composer and writer
 Stanisław Staszic
 Mieczysław Szczuka
 Karol Szymanowski
 Göran Wahlenberg
 Stanisław Witkiewicz
 Leon Wyczółkowski
 Władysław Zamoyski
 Mariusz Zaruski
 Ludwik Zejszner
 Stefan Żeromski

Rankings

 Polish Tatra National Park is ranked 12th place by CNN
 The Wall Street Journal recognized Morskie Oko as one of the five most beautiful lakes in the world

See also
Mountain Rescue Service (Slovakia)
Sudetes
Tatrzańskie Ochotnicze Pogotowie Ratunkowe (Tatra Volunteer Search and Rescue (Poland))
Tourism in Poland

References

Bibliography

External links

 – (available in: ENG) 
  Municipal website (available in: ENG, SLV) 
 Zakopane – municipal website (available in: POL, ENG) 
 TANAP – Slovak Tatra National Park (available in: SLV, ENG, POL) 
 TPN – Polish Tatra National Park (available in POL only) 

Commercial tourism-oriented websites
 The High Tatras - Accommodation and Tourism (available in: SLV, CZE, POL, ENG, GER)
 Vysoké Tatry, Slovakia (available in: ENG, GER, SLV, POL)
 Tatry - The smallest mountains in the biggest detail. (available in: ENG, CZE)
 Tatra auf Travelia.sk

Mountaineering
 Tatra Volunteer Rescue Service (available in POL only)
 Mountaineering in Tatra Mountains (practical info about climbing in Tatras)

Photography
 K2 Studio - photographs of the Tatras (available in: SLV, ENG)
 360 - a spherical panoramic journey in 1583 pieces (available in: POL, ENG)
 CinemaPhoto.pl - photographs in Tatras (available in: POL, ENG)
 Astonishing Vintage Images of the Tatra Mountains

 
Mountain ranges of Poland
Mountain ranges of Slovakia
Mountain ranges of the Western Carpathians
Natura 2000 in Poland
Natura 2000 in Slovakia
Prešov Region
Lesser Poland Voivodeship